Fiebre may refer to:

Music
 La Fiebre, an American band
 "Fiebre" (song), by Ricky Martin, 2018
 "Fiebre", a song by Yolandita Monge from Fiebre de Luna, 1994
 "Fiebre", a song by Bad Gyal from Slow Wine Mixtape, 2016
 "Fiebre", by David Bisbal, 2016

Other uses
 Fiebre (film), a 1971 Argentine film directed by Armando Bó